Chin Music Press is a book publishing company known for its high-quality editions.

History
The Press was founded in Seattle in 2002 by Bruce Rutledge and Yuko Enomoto. They began by publishing books on contemporary Japan, but have expanded to include books on New Orleans, China, and Korea.

After being located in various locations around Seattle for many years, in 2014 the company opened a store in Seattle's Pike Place Market.

Notable publications
 Yurei: The Japanese Ghost, by Zack Davisson
The Sun Gods, by Jay Rubin
 Shiro: Wit, Wisdom & Recipes from a Sushi Pioneer, by Shiro Kashiba
 Are You an Echo? The Lost Poetry of Misuzu Kaneko.

References

External links
 

Bookstores of the United States
Publishing companies of the United States